The Lagercrantz family is a Swedish noble family, introduced at the Swedish house of nobility.

List of people 

 Olof Lagercrantz (1911–2002), Swedish writer
 David Lagercrantz (born 1962), Swedish writer
 Marika Lagercrantz (born 1954), Swedish actress

References 

Swedish noble families
Lagercrantz family